Jürgen Luginger (born 8 December 1967) is a German former professional football player and manager.

Coaching career
Luginger became head coach of Schalke 04 II prior to the 2014–15 season.

In April 2017 he became new manager of FC 08 Homburg succeeding Jens Kiefer.

References

External links
 

1967 births
Living people
Association football defenders
German footballers
Germany under-21 international footballers
Germany youth international footballers
Bayer 04 Leverkusen players
Fortuna Düsseldorf players
FC Schalke 04 players
Hannover 96 players
SV Waldhof Mannheim players
1. FC Saarbrücken players
Rot-Weiß Oberhausen players
Bundesliga players
2. Bundesliga players
German football managers
KFC Uerdingen 05 managers
Rot-Weiß Oberhausen managers
1. FC Saarbrücken managers
FC 08 Homburg managers
2. Bundesliga managers
3. Liga managers
Rot-Weiß Oberhausen non-playing staff